Punarjanma (English: reborn) is a 1932 Indian Bengali film directed by Premankur Atorthy.  The film was produced by New Theatres Ltd Calcutta, with music composed by R. C. Boral. The director of photography was Nitin Bose. The film starred Durgadas Bannerjee, Tulsi Chakraborty, Amar Mullick, Devbala, Krishna Halder, and Premankur Atorthey. The film saw the debut in films of one of Bengali cinema's most talented comic actors, Tulsi Chakraborty.

Cast
 Durgadas Bannerjee
 Tulsi Chakraborty
 Amar Mullick
 Devbala
 Krishna Halder
 Premankur Atorthey

References

External links

1932 films
Bengali-language Indian films
1930s Bengali-language films
Indian black-and-white films
Films directed by Premankur Atorthy